Kitturina Huli is a 1991 Indian Kannada-language romantic drama film directed, written and produced by Sai Prakash. The film stars Shashikumar and Malashri. 

The film's music was composed by Upendra Kumar and the audio was launched on the Lahari Music banner.

Cast 

Shashikumar 
Malashri 
Chi. Guru Dutt
Mukhyamantri Chandru
Keerthi
Doddanna
Umashree
Sihi Kahi Chandru
Sihi Kahi Geetha
Mysore Lokesh
H. G. Dattatreya
M. S. Karanth
B. K. Shankar

Soundtrack 
The music of the film was composed by Upendra Kumar, with lyrics by R. N. Jayagopal and Kunigal Nagabhushan.

References

External links 

Kitturina Huli (1991)

1991 films
1990s Kannada-language films
1991 romantic drama films
Indian romantic drama films
Films scored by Upendra Kumar
Films directed by Sai Prakash